Chalbachi is a rural locality (a selo) in Chalbachinsky Selsoviet of Zeysky District, Amur Oblast, Russia. The population was 273 as of 2018. There are 8 streets.

Geography 
Chalbachi is located on the left bank of the Zeya River, 65 km south of Zeya (the district's administrative centre) by road. Algach is the nearest rural locality.

References 

Rural localities in Zeysky District